Arron Graffin (born 1989) is an Irish hurler who plays as a full-back for the Antrim senior team.

Born in Cushendall, County Antrim, Graffin first arrived on the inter-county scene at the age of sixteen when he first linked up with the Antrim minor team, before later lining out with the under-21 side. He made his senior debut during the 2007 championship. Graffin immediately became a regular member of the starting fifteen and has won six Ulster medals.

As a member of the Ulster team, Graffin has lined out in the inter-provincial championship on a number of occasions. At club level he is a two-time Ulster medallist with Ruairí Óg. In addition to this Graffin has also won three championship medals with the club.

Honours

Team

Antrim
Ulster Senior Club Hurling Championship (3): 2006, 2008, 2015
Antrim Senior Club Hurling Championship (4): 2006, 2008, 2014 (c), 2015

Antrim
Ulster Senior Hurling Championship (4): 2008, 2009, 2012, 2014
Walsh Cup (1): 2008
Ulster Under-21 Hurling Championship (2): 2009 (c), 2010
Ulster Minor Hurling Championship (2): 2006, 2007

References

1989 births
Living people
Ruairi Og Cushendall hurlers
Antrim inter-county hurlers
Ulster inter-provincial hurlers